The Zion Evangelical Lutheran Church and Parsonage are located in Columbus, Wisconsin. They were added to the National Register of Historic Places in 2009.

History
The church was built in 1878. It was expanded in 1887. The parsonage was built next door in 1885. In 1903, that was also expanded.

References

Churches on the National Register of Historic Places in Wisconsin
Lutheran churches in Wisconsin
Clergy houses in the United States
Churches in Columbia County, Wisconsin
Italianate architecture in Wisconsin
Churches completed in 1878
Churches completed in 1885
Columbus, Wisconsin
National Register of Historic Places in Columbia County, Wisconsin
Italianate church buildings in the United States